Amir Naderi (, born 15 August 1946, in Abadan) is an Iranian film director, screenwriter, and photographer. He is best known for The Runner and Vegas: Based on a True Story.

Career

Amir Naderi grew up in Abadan, a working-class port city in the south of Iran. He became interested in photography and cinema at an early age. As a filmmaker he was inspired by Henri Cartier-Bresson's photography of urban experience and everyday life, as well as the aesthetics of Italian neorealist cinema, such as location shooting, the use of nonprofessional actors, looser narrative structures, and a focus on the plight of poor and working-class people. Naderi's early films explored similar themes and visual strategies, but they did so within the context of Iranian life and culture. 
Naderi made his directorial debut with Goodbye Friend in 1971.
Iranian film scholar Hamid Naficy cites Naderi's film Harmonica as an important example of how Iranian prerevolutionary films strived to represent lower-class experience and struggles without incurring state penalties or angering censors.

Naderi continued to make films after the Iranian revolution. His 1984 film The Runner is one of the seminal films of this period in Iranian cinema. The Runner gained wide critical recognition on the international film festival circuit and it brought wider attention to what has since become the celebrated "postrevolutionary art-house" cinema in Iran. The Runner and other films Naderi made in the 1980s helped develop and promote some of the visual and narrative strategies that would also appear in the works of other Iranian art-house film directors. However, these films already hinted and anticipated the director's desire to leave Iran; Hamid Naficy called them "proto-exilic" films. By the 1990s, Naderi emigrated to the United States.

Film scholar Alla Gadassik argues that Naderi's films both before and after his move to the United States share a preoccupation with displacement, fragmented spaces and solitude. The films also emphasize the importance of sensory experience and corporeal endurance in locating one's home in the world.

In this, Naderi's work is exemplary of wider themes and motifs in Iranian diasporic cinema.

Due to smaller distribution and advertising budgets, Naderi's films are not as well known as most Hollywood films. Despite that and the lack of recognizable actors in most of his films, his work tends to find distribution (mainly in Europe and Japan), and he has earned a great deal of critical acclaim. Naderi’s films and photography are also frequently the subject of retrospectives at major festivals and museums throughout the world. Lincoln Center in New York, the city that has been his home for the past 20 years, offered a complete retrospective of his work in 2001, as did the International Museum of Cinema in Turin, Italy in 2006. The most recent retrospective of his work was screened at the Busan International Film Festival, the largest in Asia.

His 2011 film Cut was shot entirely in Japanese and stars Hidetoshi Nishijima.

Amir Naderi continues to produce works of new generation of film directors such as Andrei Severny's Condition (2011), Naghmeh Shirkhan's Hamsayeh (2010)  and Ry Russo-Young's Orphans (2007).

Filmography
 Khodahafez Rafigh (1971) a.k.a. Goodbye Friend
 Tangna (1973) a.k.a. Impasse
 Sazdahani (1973) a.k.a. Harmonica
 Tangsir (1973)
 Entezar (1974) a.k.a. Waiting
 Marsiyeh (1978) a.k.a. Requiem
 Barandeh (1979) a.k.a. The Winner
 Josteju Yek (1980) a.k.a. Search One
 Josteju Doe (1981) a.k.a. Search Two
 The Runner (1985)
 Ab, Bad, Khak (1989) a.k.a. Water, Wind, Dust
 Manhattan by Numbers (1993)
 A, B, C... Manhattan (1997)
 Marathon (2002)
 Sound Barrier (2005)
 Vegas: Based on a True Story” (2008)
 Cut (2011)
 60 Seconds of Solitude in Year Zero (2011)
 Monte (2016)
Magic Lantern (2018)
Bahram Beyzaie: A Journey in Search of Identity (2021)

Awards, honors and competition entries 
 San Remo Film Festival – Best Film, Jury Prize, Requiem (1975)
 Virgin Islands Film Festival - Golden Plaque, Waiting (1975)
 Nantes Film Festival – Golden Montgolfiere (Grand Prix), The Runner (1985)
 Nantes Film Festival – Golden Montgolfiere (Grand Prix), Water Wind Dust (1989)
 Avignon Film Festival – Prix Tournage, A, B, C, Manhattan (1997)
 Cannes Film Festival - A, B, C, Manhattan Un certain regard (competition) (1997)
 Rome Film Festival – Roberto Rossellini Critics Prize, Sound Barrier (2005)
 Turin Film Festival – Bastone Bianco, Sound Barrier (2005)
 Venice Film Festival - Vegas: Based on a True Story, Official competition (2008)

See also
 Persian cinema
 Institute for the Intellectual Development of Children and Young Adults

References

External links
 

Iranian film directors
Iranian screenwriters
Iranian emigrants to the United States
Roberto Rossellini Prize recipients
People from Abadan, Iran
1946 births
Living people
Persian-language film directors